ČAFC Židenice is a Czech football club located in the cadastral community of Židenice in the city of Brno. The club currently plays at district level, the ninth tier of football in the Czech Republic.

The club played in the Czechoslovak First League, the top flight of Czechoslovak football, in the 1952 season under the name of MEZ Židenice. The club took part in the 2009–10 Czech Cup and reached the second round.

Historical names 
 1921: SK Juliánov
 before 1948: DSK Juliánov, DSK Brno XV, ČAFC Židenice
 1948: Sokol MEZ Židenice
 1953: Spartak MEZ Židenice
 1954: Spartak Židenice
 1960: TJ ZKL Brno
 1976: Zetor Brno
 1994: ČAFC Židenice

References

Football clubs in the Czech Republic
Czechoslovak First League clubs
Association football clubs established in 1921
Sport in Brno